The Twin City Handicap was an American Thoroughbred horse race first run in 1884 at Sheepshead Bay Race Track in Sheepshead Bay, New York where it continued annually through 1909. Following passage by the New York State Legislature of the Hart–Agnew Law anti-wagering bill that resulted in the closure of all racetracks in the state of New York. The devastation to the horse racing industry was such that the Sheepshead Bay Race Track never reopened. On September 2, 1909 Olambala won what would prove to be the final running of the Twin City Handicap at the Sheepshead Bay track.

In 1917 the Coney Island Jockey Club, operators of the Sheepshead Bay Race Track, transferred their race titles to The Jockey Club. As a result, in 1924 Belmont Park revived the Twin City Handicap. Won by Spot Cash, the first event at Belmont Park was run on a track made sloppy by a heavy rainstorm that the jockeys and their horses had to endure. Although the next few years saw the race continue to attract top level runners, the Wall Street Crash of October 29, 1929 and ensuing Great Depression brought further setbacks to horse racing and the race would be canceled. The final running of the Twin City Handicap took place on September 11, 1930 when future U.S. Racing Hall of Fame inductee Raymond Workman guided James Butler's three-year-old colt Questionnaire to a two-length victory while being eased up.

Records
Speed record:
 2:02 4/5 - 1 1/4 miles on dirt: Questionnaire (1930) 

Most wins:
 3 - Exile (1888, 1889)

Most wins by a jockey:
 5 - Anthony Hamilton (1886, 1888, 1889, 1892, 1894)

Most wins by a trainer:
 2 - Green B. Morris (1885, 1891)
 2 - William Lakeland (1888, 1889)
 2 - John Rogers (1892, 1894)
 2 - James G. Rowe Sr. (1896, 1905)
 2 - Frank M. Taylor (1903, 1907)

Most wins by an owner:
 2 - Green B. Morris (1885, 1891)
 2 - William Lakeland (1888, 1889)
 2 - Lucky Baldwin (1893, 1895)

Winners

References

Discontinued horse races in New York (state)
Open middle distance horse races
Belmont Park
Sheepshead Bay Race Track
Recurring sporting events established in 1884
Recurring sporting events disestablished in 1930
1884 establishments in New York (state)
1930 disestablishments in New York (state)